The JCC, Jaeneung Culture Center, is a multi purpose complex for education and culture designed by Ando Tadao, a renowned Japanese architect. The JCC Art Center has a concert hall and a museum (JCC Museum) in the main building. The JCC Creative Center has an auditorium and a creative studio along with a roof garden.

References

Art museums and galleries in Seoul
Tadao Ando buildings